The Palacio de Santa Cruz is an Early-Renaissance palace in Valladolid, in Castile and León, Spain. Construction began in 1486 but in 1490 building came under the control of Lorenzo Vázquez de Segovia who finally completed it in 1491.

Founded by Cardinal Mendoza, the college is considered to be the earliest extant building of the Spanish Renaissance. Some observers believe that some of the classical details may have been added to the facade at a later date. One anomaly is the lack of full symmetry of the main facade. Nevertheless, details such as the main doorway are generally accepted as original to Vázquez's design. Confirmation of this impression is the similar doorway on the palace of the Dukes of Medinaceli built to the designs of the architect at Collogudo to the north east of Madrid. The dukes were a branch of the same influential Mendoza family as the cardinal.

Notes

Buildings and structures completed in 1491
Houses completed in the 15th century
Museums in Valladolid
Palaces in Valladolid
Renaissance architecture in Valladolid
Bien de Interés Cultural landmarks in the Province of Valladolid